Emmen may refer to:

Emmen, Netherlands, a town and municipality in the Province of Drenthe
FC Emmen, an association football club
Emmen, Overijssel, a hamlet in the municipality of Dalfsen
Emmen, Switzerland, a city in the Canton of Lucerne
Emmen, Germany, a village in the district Gifhorn, Lower Saxony

See also
Emen (disambiguation)
Emme (disambiguation)